Gol Gazabad (also Romanized as Gol Gazābād) is a village in Nazil Rural District, Nukabad District, Khash County, Sistan and Baluchestan Province, Iran. At the 2006 census, its population was 19, in 6 families.

References 

Populated places in Khash County